Pir Shahverdi (After 78's Islamic revolution: Pir Khodaverdi) ( also , also Romanized as Pīr-e Shāhverdī, Pileh Shāhvardī, Pīr Shāhverdī and Pīr Khodāverdī) is a village in Kuh Sardeh Rural District, in the Central District of Malayer County, Hamadan Province, Iran. At the 2006 census, its population was 119, in 29 families.

References 

Populated places in Malayer County